In the Distance is a 2017 novel by writer and professor Hernán Diaz. The story recounts the life of Håkan, a Swedish emigrant who is separated from his brother on their journey to the United States in the mid-19th century. Penniless, Håkan travels across the American West, sometimes in very harsh conditions, with the goal of finding his brother in New York City.

Writing and composition

The novel took six years to write. Diaz was drawn to the Western genre as he thought it had not "[fulfilled] its promise or potential.". Diaz wrote the book in Manhattan and Brooklyn.

Reception

Critical reception
Carys Davies, writing for The Guardian, referred to the novel as a "thrilling narrative, full of twists and turns". Catherine Taylor, in her review for the Financial Times, praised In the Distance as an "[...] extraordinary epic tale".

Honors

The novel was a finalist for the PEN/Faulkner Award for Fiction and for the Pulitzer Prize.

References

2017 American novels
2017 debut novels
Novels set in California
Western (genre) novels
Coffee House Press books